Dai Bingguo (born March 31, 1941) is a Chinese politician and professional diplomat. Since 2008, Dai has emerged as one of the foremost and highest-ranking figures of Chinese foreign policy in the Hu Jintao administration.

A graduate of Sichuan University, majoring in Russian language, Dai was instrumental in the normalization of diplomatic relations between China and the Soviet Union. Between 1989 and 1991 Dai served as the Chinese ambassador to Hungary. He then served in a succession of roles in the Department of Foreign Affairs. He served as a State Councilor, director of general office of Central Foreign Affairs Commission of CCP Central Committee, an office that acts as the primary foreign affairs organ of the Chinese Communist Party, and director of general office of National Security Leadership Group of the CCP Central Committee, in which he serves in the capacity as a national security advisor to the CCP General Secretary.

Biography
Dai Bingguo was born in a village located in Yinjiang County, Guizhou Province. He belongs to the Tujia ethnic minority. He graduated from the department of foreign languages of Sichuan University, majoring in Russian, and later studied at the China Foreign Affairs University (CFAU). He joined the Chinese Communist Party in June 1973. He served as the Chinese Ambassador to Hungary from 1989 to 1991. He had previously served in the Foreign Ministry of the PRC for many years. He was elevated to Vice Foreign Minister in December 1993. In June 1995, Dai was transferred from the "foreign affairs system" of the State Council to the "international liaison system" of the Central Committee of the CCP, and became Vice Director of the International Department of the Central Committee of the CCP. In August 1997, on the eve of the 15th CCP National Congress, he was promoted to Director of the International Department. In May 2003, Dai returned to the Foreign Ministry and served as Vice Minister until April 2008, being responsible for handling the North Korea nuclear crisis. In March 2008, he was appointed State Councillor and Party group member on the State Council.

On July 8, 2009, Dai replaced the Chinese President Hu Jintao at the G8 summit in L'Aquila, Italy after Hu had to leave the summit because of July 2009 Ürümqi riots involving Uyghurs and Han-Chinese.

Dai was appointed by Chinese leader Hu Jintao as his special representative to chair the Strategic Track of the U.S.-China Strategic and Economic Dialogue for the Chinese side in 2009.

On October 7, 2012, Dai Bingguo met with former Taiwanese Premier Hsieh Chang-ting, who was visiting mainland China in his private capacity, in Beijing. Dai and Hsieh exchanged views on topics of mutual interest.

In March 2013, Dai Bingguo retired as a State Councillor at the end of his term and retired from politics in China.

Dai Bingguo became chairman of Jinan University in November 2013, and he stepped down as chairman in November 2019.

In September 2019, Dai Bingguo represented Chinese President Xi Jinping to attend memorial ceremonies held by the French government in Paris for late President Jacques Chirac.

Personal
Dai Bingguo's father-in-law is former Culture Minister Huang Zhen.

External links
Dai Bingguo's profile at people.com.cn

References 

|-

Living people
1941 births
People from Tongren
People's Republic of China politicians from Guizhou
Chinese Communist Party politicians from Guizhou
Ambassadors of China to Hungary
Sichuan University alumni
China Foreign Affairs University alumni
Tujia people
State councillors of China